ATK Reserves and Academy was the youth section  of Indian Super League side ATK. Based in Kolkata, West Bengal, the reserve side participated in the I-League 2nd Division, the second division of Indian football, and in Calcutta Football League, men's professional football league in the state.
 
The club's academy was founded on 15 August 2018 and the Under-18 side participated in the Hero Elite League, the highest level for youth football in India. The reserve side was last coached by Deggie Cardozo and veteran tactician Sanjoy Sen was the head of youth development.

Reserves
ATK Reserves was ATK's most senior youth team and participated in I-League 2nd Division as well as in Calcutta Football League. Reserve team would also act as a bridge between the ATK Academy and the first team. A 24-member squad was announced on 27 October 2018.

The reserve team made their first appearance in Sikkim Gold Cup in 27 October 2018 and played their first ever match against fellow Kolkata side George Telegraph S.C. The young side of ATK thrashed their comparatively experienced opponent by a margin of 5-1 goals to book their berth in the semi final of the tournament. In the semi-final they lost to Manang Marshyangdi Club of Nepal.

On 13 July 2019, it was announced that reserves will play in the Calcutta Football League 2019 Division 1, a third tier competition in CFL pyramid. A 29-member squad was also announced.

Inaugural season
ATK Reserves started the season with a comfortable 0-2 victory against city rivals Mohammedan SC at Kalyani Stadium. Thomyo Simray and Sk. Azaruddin scored the goals for ATK Reserves. ATK colts lost the next match to TRAU at home before winning against Jamshedpur FC Reserves by a 2-0 margin. The results of the next three matches had put Deggie Cardozo's men at backfoot where ATK drew 1 and lose 2 matches which included a 0-4 drubbing by Mohammedan at home.

On 9 March 2019 ATK reserves met Jamshedpur FC reserves in an away encounter which ended 0-4 in favour of the away side. In the final three matches of the season ATK Reserves won 1, drew 1 and lost 1. The joint highest goalscorers for ATK Reserves were captain Yumnam Gopi Singh and Thomyo Simray, both finishing the season with 5 goals.

Last squad

Academy
ATK opened their academy in Barasat, Kolkata in association with Aditya School of Sports. Also known as the ATK Aditya Football Academy, it followed the widely renowned structure, involving residential education with sports. The academy featured three age categories - U13, U15 and U18.
Former United SC and Mohun Bagan coach Sanjoy Sen took charge of the academy teams. Sen had signed a 12-month contract with the two-time ISL champions.

U-18 team
ATK U18 team played in the Hero Elite League and was placed in the Kolkata Zone along with East Bengal FC, Mohun Bagan, SAI Kolkata, United SC and Rainbow A.C. They finished third in the 2018 Hero Elite League zonal phase behind Mohun Bagan and East Bengal. Bishnu Bordoloi is the highest goalscorer of the team with 10 goals. The U18 team also played the 2018 IFA Shield and finished third in group stage.

Last squad

 (captain)

Statistics and records

Head Coaches Record

Kit manufacturers and shirt sponsors

References

ATK (football club)
2018 establishments in West Bengal
Association football clubs established in 2018
Football clubs in Kolkata
Indian reserve football teams
Football academies in India